"King For A Day" is a 1985 song by the British band the Thompson Twins. It was released as the third single from the band's fifth album Here's To Future Days.

It was written by Tom Bailey, Alannah Currie, and Joe Leeway. There are two versions of the song, with various edits and remixes of the two. The UK version of the song has alternate lyrics and is more synth based. The US and album versions contain electric guitar. The single peaked at number 22 in the UK Singles Chart, spending six weeks on the chart and would be the band's final UK Top 40 hit. The single fared better in America where it peaked at number 8 on the U.S. Billboard Hot 100 and also peaked at number 13 on the Billboard Adult Contemporary chart. It was a success on the Swedish Trackslistan, occupying the number one spot for four consecutive weeks in November 1985, during a seven week chart stay.

The B-side, "Rollunder", was exclusive to this single with two versions; a shorter 7" version and an extended version. It is a variation of the band's song "Roll Over", which was planned for release as a single earlier in 1985, but withdrawn from sale at the last moment.

Music video
A promotional music video was made for the single that was directed by Meiert Avis. Three edited versions of the video are known to exist. The first version features Bailey, Currie, and Leeway at the "Hard Cash Hotel" with Bailey singing to Currie as he attempts to cheer her up. The ending shows the trio playing their instruments in front of stained glass windows with a backing band dressed as nuns. The second edited version shows more shots of the trio performing with the backing band interspersed with scenes from the trio at the hotel. The third edit omits any scenes from the hotel and solely features the trio performing with the backing band dressed as nuns in front of stained glass windows.

Formats 
7" UK vinyl single (1985) Arista TWINS 7
"King For A Day" – 4:10
"Rollunder" – 4:40

12" UK vinyl single (1985) Arista TWINS 127
"King For A Day" (Extended Mix) – 8:02
"Rollunder" – 6:50

12" UK vinyl single (1985) Arista TWINS 227
"King For A Day" (U.S. Re-mix) – 7:20
"Rollunder" – 6:50

12" UK vinyl Picture Disc (1985) Arista TWIPD 7
"King For A Day" (Extended Mix) – 8:02
"Rollunder" – 6:50

7" U.S. vinyl single (1985) Arista AS1-9450
"King For A Day" (Single Version) – 3:58
"Rollunder" – 4:40

12" U.S. vinyl single (1985) Arista ADP-9442
"King For A Day" (Rock Radio Edit) – 4:10
"King For A Day" (LP Version) – 5:20
"Roll Over" (LP Version) – 4:58

Personnel 
Written by  Tom Bailey, Alannah Currie, and Joe Leeway.
Tom Bailey – vocals, piano, Fairlight, synthesizers, guitar, contrabass, Fairlight and drum programming
Alannah Currie – marimba, acoustic drums, percussion, tuned percussion, backing vocals, lyrics
Joe Leeway – congas, percussion, backing vocals
Nile Rodgers – additional guitar and backing vocals
 Produced by Nile Rodgers and Tom Bailey
 Mixed by James Farber
 Mixed at Skyline Studio, NYC
 Photography – Rebecca Blake
 Artwork/Design – Andie Airfix, Satori
 Art Direction – Alannah

Chart performance

Official versions

In popular culture 
 The song appeared in an episode of the short-lived Dick Clark's Nitetime in 1985.
 The song appears in the 1986 film, Lucas.

References 

1985 singles
Thompson Twins songs
Songs written by Alannah Currie
Songs written by Tom Bailey (musician)
Song recordings produced by Nile Rodgers
Songs written by Joe Leeway
Music videos directed by Meiert Avis
1985 songs